"I Like It" is the lead single from American rock band Foxy Shazam's fourth studio album, The Church of Rock and Roll. It was released as a free download on Foxy Shazam's website and Facebook page on October 6, 2011 before being released on iTunes. It is their highest charting single to date peaking at #5 on the Mainstream Rock Charts.

Music video
A music video directed by Bill Fishman was released online on 6 February 2012.
It was filmed at the First German Reformed Church in Cincinnati, Ohio, which keyboardist Sky White had purchased with two other friends. For the video, Foxy Shazam invited fans to come dressed up as Time Warp dancers from Rocky Horror Picture Show or as 90's club kids.

Track listing
7" vinyl
"I Like It"
"I'll Be Home Soon Mother Earth"

CD Promo
"I Like It"
"I Like It (Instrumental)"

Charts

Weekly charts

Year-end charts

References

External links
 https://itunes.apple.com/us/album/i-like-it-single/id474058746

2011 songs
I.R.S. Records singles
2011 singles
Songs written by Justin Hawkins